The 2011 Tour of Utah was the eighth edition of the Tour of Utah.  For the first time, the race was included on the UCI America Tour, with a classification of 2.1.  As such, the race is only open to teams on the UCI Pro Tour, UCI Professional Continental and UCI Continental circuits.  The race took place between August 9–14, 2011 as a six-day, six-stage race, similar to the prior two years.   The race joined the 2011 Tour of California and the 2011 USA Pro Cycling Challenge as the only three UCI-ranked stage races in the United States

Teams 

Also appearing will be four UCI Professional Continental teams and seven UCI Continental teams, making a total of 16 teams that will be sending either 6 or 8 riders per team to the event for a total of 120 riders. Of the teams competing, only six of the teams had competed in the 2010 Tour of Utah (not counting the partial participation by two members of Team RadioShack in 2010).

UCI ProTeams
  *
 
 
 
 

UCI Professional Continental Teams
 
 
  *
  *

(* – participated in 2010)

UCI Continental Teams
  *
  *
  *
 
 PureBlack Racing (Rabobank Continental Team)
 Gobernación de Antioquia-Indeportes Antiquia
 Realcyclist.com Cycling Team

Contenders 

In addition to all of the last three champions of the race -- (Jeff Louder (BMC), Francisco Mancebo (Realcyclist.com) and Leipheimer (RadioShack)) -- the race added potential contenders Tom Danielson (Garmin), Christian Vande Velde (Garmin), Tejay van Garderen (HTC), Ryder Hesjedal (Garmin), George Hincapie (BMC), Jani Brajkovič (RadioShack), David Zabriskie (Garmin) and Óscar Sevilla (Gobernación).  Because the race was held earlier in August this year than in previous years, a few riders—notably Brajkovič—were using Utah as their final tune-up for the 2011 Vuelta a España.

Stages 

Like 2009 and 2010, the 2011 race had a prologue, three road stages, a criterium and a time trial.  Unlike the 2010 race, though, the criterium was measured by distance instead of time.  In addition, the race had stages finish in Ogden and Provo, reducing its focus on Salt Lake City and Park City.  Although the significantly stronger UCI-ranked field figured to create a more competitive race, a breakaway on the mountainous first stage gave four riders—Leipheimer and Brajkovič from RadioShack and Sevilla and Sergio Henao from Gobernación—a lead over all the other contenders of more than 2:30.  Leipheimer then used second-place finishes in stages 3 and 5 to defend his championship and become the race's first repeat winner.

Prologue 
August 9, 2011 -- Utah Olympic Park, individual time trial, 
The uphill prologue required the riders to time trial along a road running parallel to the bobsled run at the Utah Olympic Park in Park City.  Because of the nature of the climb, most cyclists used their regular bikes instead of time-trial bikes.  Colombian and Spanish riders took the first three places, with Sergio Henao of the Colombian team Gobernacion de Antioquia showing his climbing skills by winning the sprint.

Stage 1 
August 10, 2011 --  Ogden to Ogden, 
Stage 1 featured three loops of a 61 km course around Ogden, with each loop featuring an ascent of North Ogden Pass Road. In the end, as the four riders in the breakaway worked to gain time on the rest of the field, Anthony was able to sit on the breakaway and then attack it at the end for the stage win. However, the other four riders in the break established a huge advantage of over 2' 30" on their main rivals in the general classification.  116 riders remained in the race after this stage.

Stage 2 
August 11, 2011 -- Lehi to Provo, 
However, Jack Bauer from  managed to get a jump on both sprinters due to two crashes inside of 7 km, took off with a kilometer to go and was able to hold on for victory. Only three riders failed to finish the stage.

Stage 3 
August 12, 2011 -- Miller Motorsports Park, individual time trial, 
Stage 3 was contested on a similar but slightly longer course than the 2009 and 2010 Tours used. However, Leipheimer took over the general classification lead, with his teammate Jani Brajkovič taking over second.  112 riders remained in the race.

Stage 4 
August 13, 2011 -- Salt Lake City, 
Stage 4 was a criterium around the state capital in Salt Lake City, using part of the course employed for the prologue in the previous two tours.  The loop was around 12 km, and the riders were required to make 11 circuits of it, including a 13% climb up East Capitol Street in each circuit.  Another Colombian rider, Janier Acevedo from Gobernacion de Antioquia, won the stage and returned his team to the lead in the teams classification.  After this stage, 104 riders remained in the race, meaning that only a total of 16 riders had left the race, but among the riders failing to complete this stage was fifth-place Jesse Anthony, who fell ill overnight.

Stage 5 
August 14, 2010 -- Kimball Junction to Snowbird, 
The final stage of the 2010 Tour, Stage 5, was identical to the previous year's final stage.  It began from Kimball Junction, just outside Park City, and trekked for 161 km through the mountains until ending on a mountaintop finish at the Snowbird ski resort.  The top two riders in the general classification, Leipheimer and Sergio Henao, broke away from the rest of the elite riders to win the stage, with Henao finishing slightly ahead.  Leipheimer's finish also propelled him to a one-point victory in the "King of the Mountains" competition.  16 people failed to finish this stage, but the race ended with 88 of the original 120 contestants completing the tour.

Overall

Classification leadership

References 

Tour of Utah
Tour of Utah
Tour of Utah
Tour of
Tour of Utah